Hugh Kappel (born 1910 Berlin – 1982) was an American artist.

Life
He received an M.A. in philosophy.  
He studied at Parisian art schools.  
He immigrated to New York City in 1938.
 
In 1940, he became an American citizen.  
In 1940, he met Anne Heyneman; they married; they had a daughter, Karen, in 1946; but divorced.
He taught at the Minneapolis College of Art and Design.

His work is in the Walker Art Center, and the Minneapolis Institute of Arts.
A folder is held at the Archives of American Art.

Exhibitions
2008 "Abstraction: Summer 2008", McCormick Gallery  
2005 "Abstract Painting in Minnesota: Selected Works 1930 to the Present" Minnesota Museum of American Art

References

Bibliography
The Happy Hippopotamus 
The Whoosits

1910 births
1982 deaths
American artists
Minneapolis College of Art and Design faculty
German emigrants to the United States
Artists from Berlin